The MYX VJ Search is a special competition held annually by MYX, the number one music channel in the Philippines. It gives young people the chance to fulfill their dreams of becoming the next MYX VJ.

Auditions are held at ABS-CBN in Quezon City, usually on four separate dates within the same month. After the auditions, 12 finalists are chosen who then go through a training experience process usually lasting up to two months. The MYX VJ Search is broadcast on MYX and split into 8 episodes, the last episode being the finals night, in which the winners are announced. The winners are chosen by MYX, through the text votes of the viewers and by the MYX team's own selection.

For the MYX VJ Searches 2007, 2008 and 2017, four winners were chosen on the finals night, two males and two females. For the MYX VJ Searches 2009 and 2018 there were only two grand winners, while for the MYX VJ Searches 2010, 2011, 2012, 2014 and 2019, three winners were selected. There was no public search in 2013, 2015 and 2016; only private auditions were held.

The MYX VJ Search began in 2007.

The finalists and winners of past MYX VJ Searches are as follows:

MYX VJ Search 2007
Dianne Eclar
Drei Felix
Odessa Fernandez
Mica Froilan
Igi Guerrero
Rocco Nacino
Jet Singh
Sanya Smith
Sandra Soriano
Atom Ungson

Winners: Drei, Mica, Igi and Sanya.

MYX VJ Search 2008
Paolo Alino
Robi Domingo
Macky Escalona
Cerah Hernandez
Kai Hocson
Ezra Lacsamana
JC Lingad
Chino Lui Pio
Jessica Mendoza
Sam Pinto
Bianca Roque
Monica Yncierto
Winners: Robi, Chino, Bianca and Monica.

MYX VJ Search 2009
Andi Eigenmann
Lana Roi
Sarah Gaugler
Nel Gomez
Miki Hahn
Kevin Lapeña
Miko Morente
Janine Ramirez
Sam Reynolds (voluntarily left due to academic reasons, being he had to start his first year at University in England)
Ant Santos
Jade Sison
Toff Tiozon

Winners: Nel and Janine.

MYX VJ Search 2010
Ton Vergel de Dios
Issa Perez de Tagle
Kat Espe
Dane Hipolito
Josh Katigbak
Marco Mañalac
Christine Manalaysay
Robin Nievera
Kirsten Rice
Julz Savard
Andy Smith
Anj Rosette Uy

Winners: Ton, Robin and Julz.

MYX VJ Search 2011
Mike Advincula
Marga Bermudez
Chewy Buhion
Earl Burgos
Camille Caoile
Cara Eriguel
Martin Javier
JJ Kaufman
Angelia Ong
Joyce Pring
Drew Rivera
K-La Rivera

Winners: Mike, K-La and Joyce.

MYX VJ Search 2012
Kristine Antonio
Mica Caldito
Kevin Dineros
Mike Mariano
Michelle Ng
Karen Pacheco
Anjo Resurreccion
Hadi Rushdy
Paulina Sotto
Marcky Stuart
Ericka Villongco
Ysabel Yuzon
Winners: Kristine, Mike and Michelle.

2013
There was no public search for 2013; instead private auditions were held through coordination with various talent agencies. The winners were chosen directly by the MYX management to coincide with the channel's new look. The VJs selected were Karla Aguas, Sam Concepcion and Ai Dela Cruz.

MYX VJ Search 2014
Marion Aunor
Luigi Enzo D'Avola
Hazel Faith Dela Cruz
Mercedes Espina
Jose Gabriel La Viña
Gianna Llanes
Victor Romeo Lopez
Eunick Nicole Nobe
Christian Edgar Reasonda
Rebecca Sadhwani
Rafa Siguion-Reyna
Mark Anthony Thompson
Winners: Luigi, Gianna and Victor.

2015
There was no public search for 2015; instead private auditions were held through coordination with various talent agencies. The winners were chosen directly by the MYX management. The winners were Diego Loyzaga, Tippy Dos Santos and Erica Abello.

2016
There was no public search yet again for 2016; instead private auditions were held through coordination with various talent agencies. The winners were chosen directly by the MYX management. The winners were Alex Diaz, Sarah Carlos, Jairus Aquino and Sharlene San Pedro.

A new competition on MYXph.com, the MYX Vlogger Search, unveiled its winner at the MYX Music Awards 2016. Sunshine Kim won and later became a MYX VJ.

MYX VJ Search 2017
Juan Alfonso Avila
Kimberly Ann Cruz
Arturo Daza
Martin David Javier
Mary Angelique Manto
Michelle Anne Naldo
Nicholas Olaes
Dan Aberiel Pojas
Dale Rossly
J.C. Tevez
Debbie Then
Michaela Villanueva

Winners: J.C., Debbie, Kim and Turs.

MYX VJ Search 2018
Samm Alvero
Gelo Buencamino
Kyler Carbonell
Sean Dandasan
Kat De Guzman
Gelo Gabriel
Aiyana Perlas
Sky Quizon
Kaye Reyes
Gari Rivera
Ethan Salvador
Nia

Winners: Samm and Kaye.

MYX VJ Search 2019
Hans Braga
Cholo Dela Cruz
Anton Fausto
Aya Fernandez
Gio Kawachi
Mac Lofgren
Eryka Lucas
Mika Madrid
Dani Mortel
EJ Nacion
Bea Rodriguez
Denise Silva
Winners: Anton, Dani and Aya.

References

External links
Official MYX website
Official MYX Facebook Page

Myx
Competitions in the Philippines
2007 establishments in the Philippines